Gav Kosh-e Sofla (also Romanized as Gāv Kosh-e Soflá) is a village in Khaveh-ye Jonubi Rural District, in the Central District of Delfan County, Lorestan Province, Iran. At the 2006 census, its population was 772, in 169 families.

References 

Towns and villages in Delfan County